Midsomer Norton and Welton was a station on the Great Western Railway line from Bristol to Frome via Radstock (originally the Bristol and North Somerset Railway). The station was originally named just Welton, being located in a valley at the village of Welton, Somerset. It closed to passengers in 1959 with the closure of the line to passenger traffic, and to goods in 1964.

Midsomer Norton was also served by a second station on the Somerset and Dorset Joint Railway.

References

Former Great Western Railway stations
Disused railway stations in Somerset
Railway stations in Great Britain opened in 1873
Railway stations in Great Britain closed in 1959
Midsomer Norton
1873 establishments in England
1959 disestablishments in England